The Monument to Lieutenant General Manuel Cassola is an instance of public art in Madrid, Spain. It consists of a bronze statue of Manuel Cassola designed by Mariano Benlliure topping off a stone pedestal.

History and description
The monument was funded via popular subscription among the military officers, and the bronze came from handles of sword and sabres donated by the subscriptors. The design was awarded to Mariano Benlliure.

The bronze full body figure of the general, in critical and reflective attitude, is depicted wearing a campaign uniform, extending his right arm forward, while grabbing a roll of paper with his left hand, a nod to his reform proposal in the form of the draft of the Ley Constitutiva del Ejército.

The monument was moved for the first time to the plaza de Mariano de Cavia (near El Retiro) in 1929. Over the years, the monument would end up at its current location in the Parque del Oeste.

References
Citations

Bibliography
 
 
 

Outdoor sculptures in Madrid
Bronze sculptures in Spain
Sculptures by Mariano Benlliure
Statues of military officers
Buildings and structures in Casa de Campo neighborhood, Madrid
Monuments and memorials in Madrid
Sculptures of men in Spain